Leroy Abanda Mfomo (born 7 June 2000) is a French professional footballer who plays as a defender for Super League Greece club Lamia, on loan from Seraing.

Club career
On 28 July 2022, Abanda signed a two-year contract with Seraing in Belgium.

International career
Born in France, Abanda is of Cameroonian and Polish descent. He played twice as a youth international for the France U17 national team during the UEFA Under-17 Championship qualification.

References

External links

FFF Profile

2000 births
Living people
People from Le Blanc-Mesnil
French footballers
France youth international footballers
French sportspeople of Cameroonian descent
Association football midfielders
Football Club 93 Bobigny-Bagnolet-Gagny players
Paris Université Club footballers
AS Monaco FC players
A.C. Milan players
Neuchâtel Xamax FCS players
US Boulogne players
R.F.C. Seraing (1922) players
Swiss Super League players
Championnat National players
Championnat National 3 players
French expatriate footballers
Expatriate footballers in Switzerland
French expatriate sportspeople in Switzerland
Expatriate footballers in Italy
French expatriate sportspeople in Italy
Expatriate footballers in Belgium
French expatriate sportspeople in Belgium